Abu Bashar Mohammad Ishaque (1 November 1926 – 1 November 2003) was a Bangladeshi novelist.

Early life
Ishaque was born in the village of Shirangal in Naria, Faridpur District (now in Shariatpur District) on 1 November 1926. He studied at the Upsi Bijari Taraprasanna English High School from which he passed his matriculation exam with scholarship in 1942. In 1944, he completed his IA from Government Rajendra College in Faridpur.

Career
His first story, "Abhishap", was published in 1940 in the Nabajug magazine which was edited by the activist Kazi Nazrul Islam. This was when Abu Ishaque was still in high school. The story was later featured in the Saogat and The Azad magazines of Calcutta.

His first job was as an inspector for a private institution. Ishaque's first big literary effort, Sūrja-Dīghal Baṛī, was completed in August 1948 though waited some seven years for a publisher. It was based on four main historical themes; World War, famine, communal riots and division.

After the Partition of India in 1947, he became an assistant inspector for the Pakistan police department and was based in the cities of Karachi, Rawalpindi and Islamabad up until 1956. Graduating from Karachi University in 1960, he served in many important posts in the country as well as in diplomatic positions in the high commission offices.

In 1973, Ishaque became a sub-director for the National Security Intelligence based in Dhaka. He served as vice-consul at the Bangladeshi embassy in Akyab, Myanmar in 1974. Ishaque became the first secretary for the Bangladesh Deputy High Commission at Kolkata in 1976. In 1979, he started serving as the Chief of the National Security Intelligence's Khulna Branch. He retired from the government service in 1984.

Works
Three novels - one of which is a detective novel, two collections of short stories and the voluminous Samokalin Bangla Bhashar Obhidhan (first two parts of it have already been published from the Bangla Academy and the rest [how many?] are being prepared).

Novels
Surja-Dighal Bari (1955)
Padmar Palidwip (1986)
Jaal (1988)

Short stories
"Jook"
"MahaPatanga" (Large Insect)
"Haarem"

Awards
Bangla Academy Literary Award (1963)
Ekushey Padak (1997)
Independence Day Award (2004)

References

1926 births
2003 deaths
Bangladeshi male writers
Bengali novelists
Bengali-language writers
Recipients of the Independence Day Award
Recipients of the Ekushey Padak
Recipients of Bangla Academy Award
Bangladeshi male novelists
People from Naria Upazila
20th-century Bengalis
20th-century Muslims
Bangladeshi Sunni Muslims
Bengali Muslims
University of Karachi alumni